The 1995 Dutch Open was an ATP men's tennis tournament held in Amsterdam, Netherlands, after being transferred from Hilversum, and played on outdoor clay courts. It was the 37th edition of the tournament that was part of the World Series of the 1995 ATP Tour and was held from 24 July until 30 July 1995. Unseeded qualifier Marcelo Ríos won his second title of the year, and the second as well of his career.

Finals

Singles

 Marcelo Ríos defeated  Jan Siemerink 6–4, 7–5, 6–4

Doubles

 Marcelo Ríos /  Sjeng Schalken defeated  Wayne Arthurs /  Neil Broad 7–6, 6–2

References

External links
 ITF tournament edition details

 
Dutch Open (tennis)
Dutch Open (tennis)
Dutch Open (tennis)
Dutch Open (tennis), 1995